Thousands of full-length films were produced during the decade of the 1940s. The great actor Humphrey Bogart made his most memorable films in this decade. Frank Capra's masterpiece It's a Wonderful Life and Orson Welles's masterpiece Citizen Kane were released. Citizen Kane made use of matte paintings, miniatures and optical printing  techniques. The film noir genre was at its height. Alfred Hitchcock made his American debut with the film Rebecca, and made many classics throughout the 1940s. The most successful film of the decade was Samuel Goldwyn's The Best Years of Our Lives; the film was directed by William Wyler, and starred Fredric March, Myrna Loy, Dana Andrews, Teresa Wright, Virginia Mayo, and Harold Russell. The film won nine Academy Awards.

Technicolor

By the 1940s, Hollywood's effects specialists had over a decade of studio experience. Technicolor had been especially challenging but faster film introduced in 1939 began to make Technicolor a viable option for studio production. Rear projection in color remained out of reach until Paramount introduced a new projection system in the 1940s. New matte techniques, modified for use with color, were for the first time used in the British film The Thief of Bagdad(1940). However, the high cost of color production in the 1940s meant most films were black and white.

World War II

Hollywood films in the 1940s included morale films for the those serving in World War II and their families. War films made extensive use of models and miniature photography. New techniques developed to realistically depict naval battles were used in films like Thirty Seconds Over Tokyo (1944) and Ships with Wings (1942). In Mrs. Miniver (1942) a technique using systems of wires was used to depict two dozen model aircraft taking off in precise formation. Miniature explosions were needed for the destruction of models.

Post-war slowdown
Cinemas were located in the city and the expansion of suburban housing in the post-War period meant declining revenues at the box office. The availability of television in homes was another factor that gave families in the suburbs an alternative to traveling to the theaters located in city centers. Between 1948 and 1952 average weekly attendance declined from 90 million to 51 million.

The Supreme Court in 1948 decided in United States v. Paramount Pictures, Inc. that owning both studios and theaters violated the Sherman Antitrust Act of 1890. After this decision film studios were forced to sell their theater chains.

Lists of films

See also
 Film
 History of film
 Lists of films
 1940s in music

References 

 
Films by decade
Film by decade
1940s decade overviews